Voltage-gated potassium channel subunit beta-3 is a protein that in humans is encoded by the KCNAB3 gene. The protein encoded by this gene is a voltage-gated potassium channel beta subunit.

References

Further reading

External links 
 

Ion channels